This is a list of episodes for the fourth season (1978–79) of the NBC television series Quincy, M.E..

Episodes

Ratings
The show ranked 50th out of 114 shows for the 1978-79 season, with a 17.4 rating and a 27 share.

References

External links
 

1978 American television seasons
1979 American television seasons